Leslie Mather Palm (born October 14, 1944) is a retired United States Marine Corps major general and former publisher and CEO of the Marine Corps Association.  His last active duty position was the Director, Marine Corps Staff, Headquarters Marine Corps, Washington, D.C. (1996–1998). Palm retired on September 1, 1998.

Biography
Leslie Palm was born on October 14, 1944, in Marysville, California. He earned his Bachelor of Science degree in anthropology in 1966 from the University of Oregon, where he was a member of Sigma Chi. He later earned a master's degree in Military Arts and Sciences from the Army Command and General Staff College in 1980 and a Master of Arts in National Security and Strategic Studies from the Naval War College in 1986.

Palm entered the Marine Corps through the Platoon Leaders Course Program and was commissioned a second lieutenant on November 1, 1966. Upon completion of The Basic School at Marine Corps Base Quantico, Virginia, in August 1967, he attended Field Artillery Officers Basic Course at Fort Sill, Oklahoma, graduating in November 1967.

From December 1967 to December 1968, Palm served in Vietnam as a Forward Observer and Fire Direction Officer in the 1st Battalion, 13th Marines at Khe Sanh. He also commanded a 155 mm gun platoon and 8" platoon of the 5th 155 mm Gun Battery. Upon returning to the United States he was assigned to Fort Sill as a gunnery instructor in both the basic and career branches. While in this assignment, he was promoted to captain on December 1, 1970.

In January 1972, he was assigned to the 3rd Marine Division on Okinawa where he commanded D Battery, 2nd Battalion, 12th Marines and served as the Battalion S-3 Officer. Returning from overseas, he attended the Amphibious Warfare School, Quantico, then was reassigned to The Basic School, where he commanded the Artillery Demonstration Unit. During May 1974, he transferred to Headquarters Marine Corps, where he was assigned to the Officer Assignment Section until June 1976, when he was selected as the aide-de-camp to the Assistant Commandant of the Marine Corps. He was promoted to major on July 1, 1977.

From July 1977 to June 1979, he served in the 2nd Marine Division, Camp Lejeune, North Carolina, as the S-3 Officer for the 1st Battalion, 10th Marines. He then attended the Army Command & General Staff College, graduating in June 1980. General Palm was ordered to Amphibious Group Two in Little Creek, Virginia, where he served as Assistant Plans Officer and the Supporting Arms Coordinator. He was promoted to lieutenant colonel on July 1, 1982.

From July 1982 until October 1983, he served as the Director of Manpower for the Marine Corps Air Ground Combat Center Twentynine Palms, California, then was reassigned to the 7th Marine Amphibious Brigade to command the 4th Battalion (redesignation 5th Battalion), 11th Marines until July 1985. He graduated from the Naval War College, Newport, R.I., in June 1986.

He was again ordered to Headquarters Marine Corps and served as the Head of Manpower Planning and Programming and Budgeting Section. On July 1, 1988, he was assigned as the Military Assistant to the Assistant Commandant. he was promoted to colonel on October 1, 1988. When the Office of the Assistant Commandant and the Office of the Chief of Staff were combined in February 1989, he assumed the responsibilities of Secretary of the General Staff.

On August 16, 1990, he assumed command of the 10th Marine Regiment and participated in Operations Desert Shield and Desert Storm. While serving in this capacity, he was selected in December 1991 for promotion to brigadier general. He was advanced to that grade on May 1, 1992, and assumed his duties as Assistant Deputy Chief of Staff for Manpower and Reserve Affairs, (Manpower Plans & Policy), Headquarters Marine Corps, Washington, D.C.

Brigadier General Palm assumed command of Marine Corps Air Ground Combat Center Twentynine Palms, California on August 16, 1994. In February 1995, while serving as the Commanding General, MCAGCC Twentynine Palms, he was promoted to the grade of Major General.  In 1996, he became the Director, Marine Corps Staff, Headquarters Marine Corps, Washington, D.C., serving in that post until 1998. Palm retired on September 1, 1998.

After retirement, Palm became the publisher and CEO of the Marine Corps Association, which publishes the Leatherneck Magazine and the Marine Corps Gazette.

Awards

See also

Leatherneck Magazine
Marine Corps Gazette

Notes

References

External links

1944 births
Living people
People from Marysville, California
University of Oregon alumni
United States Marine Corps personnel of the Vietnam War
United States Army Command and General Staff College alumni
Naval War College alumni
United States Marine Corps generals
Recipients of the Legion of Merit
American publishers (people)
Businesspeople from California
Military personnel from California